Alamitos Bay Yacht Club is a yacht club located in Alamitos Bay (Long Beach, California), United States. The club belongs to the Southern California Yachting Association.

History 
Alamitos Bay Yacht Club was founded on August 14, 1924, by twelve local sailors and boat builders. On May 30, 1926, ABYC was formally organized with Richard L. Russell, Sr., elected the first Commodore, and ABYC was incorporated within the laws of the State of California on January 28, 1928.

Racing 
Besides many National and North American Championships, the Clifford Day Mallory Cup in 1976 and the 2002 Snipe Western Hemisphere & Orient Championship, ABYC hosted the following World Championships:
Finn Gold Cup in 1974
Tornado World Championships in 1977 and 1993
International 14 Fleet Racing World Championships in 1979 and 2006
Snipe Worlds in 1981
ISAF World Women's Sailing Championship in 1991
International A-class catamaran Worlds in 1997
Melges 24 Worlds in 1999
Viper 640 Worlds in 2019

Sailors 
Chuck Kober, who started sailing Snipes in the 1930s, was continental champion in Dragon in 1964 and became president of the United States Yacht Racing Union (USYRU) in 1982. Peter Barrett was gold medallist in Star at the 1968 Summer Olympics and silver at the 1964 Summer Olympics. Steve Bloemke and Gregg Morton won the Snipe Junior World Championship in 1982. Allison Jolly, also a former Snipe sailor, became the first-ever Gold medalist in the women's 470 event at the 1988 Summer Olympics while John Shadden won the bronze medal in the men's 470. John Latiolait, Jerry Montgomery, Jim McLeod, Don Reiman and Dave Thompson won the Transpacific Yacht Race in 1997. Howard Hamlin and Mike Martin won the 505 World Championship in 1999. Sarah Glaser won a silver medal in the 470 class at the Summer Olympics and was named US Sailor of the Year in 2000.

References

External links 
 Official website

 
1924 establishments in California